Przegędza  is a village in the administrative district of Gmina Czerwionka-Leszczyny, within Rybnik County, Silesian Voivodeship, in southern Poland.

The village has a population of 1,549.

References

Villages in Rybnik County